Fawad Siddiqui is an American actor, improvisational comedian, journalist and cartoonist.

He began acting professionally in TV and film in 2008 and first appeared on the USA Network television show Burn Notice alongside Bruce Campbell and Jeffrey Donovan, then in the George Clooney film The Men Who Stare At Goats with Ewan McGregor, and in the indie films The Bait and Festival of Lights—starring Jimi Mistry and Aidan Quinn. He also had a role in Queen Latifah produced sequel The Cookout Part 2—starring Charlie Murphy, Mike Tyson and Faizon Love—and had a recurring role on the fifth season of the Lifetime Network series Army Wives. He also appeared in the latest season of the FX/The Audience Network series Damages—starring Glenn Close, Rose Byrne and John Goodman—as the shady Afghan information broker Shahbaz Gul opposite Dylan Baker, and in the French comedy Bienvenue à Bord—opposite popular French comedic actors Franck Dubosc and Valérie Lemercier, released in October 2011. He was featured in the 2013 indie drama Sunlight Jr., from critically acclaimed director Laurie Collyer, in the role of Jamshed opposite Matt Dillon and Naomi Watts. He played the role of Mohammed Al Ghamdi alongside Rupert Friend in the second season of the Emmy Award-winning Showtime series Homeland, starring Claire Danes and Mandy Patinkin. In 2014, he appeared as Arash on the season 2 premier of USA's Graceland with Aaron Tveit. In 2017, he appeared as a mosque Imam on 24: Legacy on Fox and as Dr. Ravi Govilla opposite Kyle Chandler on the Netflix original series Bloodline.

In 2018, he also co-starred as one of the main comedic villains, Leo, opposite comedian Paul Rodriguez in Rodriguez' the comedic film Chateau Vato, which eventually premiered at the 2020 Miami International Film Festival and was subsequently released on HBO Max. He also had a guest appearance on the Project Greenlight winning series Grown, which was the premiere fictional series on The Complex. In 2019, he had the role of Younas in the Casey Afleck film Our Friend, from critically acclaimed director Gabriela Cowperthwaite. He then appeared on NBC's The Blacklist starring James Spader as the top local Iranian CIA contact employed by Red Reddington's friend Farhad to drive Harold Cooper, played by Harry Lennix, on his mission in the country on the Season 7 episode 'Kuwait'. In 2020, Siddiqui appeared on the Gold Globe winning series Ramy with star Ramy Youssef on Hulu. He also had a recurring guest-star role as Professor Dawley on the first season of the series The Zombie Chronicles, from creator Lisa Waring, a slice of life series about a young, aspiring hip-hop artist/zombie in a world where zombies are a normal part of life. That year he also voice-directed and co-starred in the animated film Box Life, from writer/director Michael Sirjue. In 2021, Siddiqui appeared as head hospital lawyer Neil Persaud on the hit show New Amsterdam on NBC opposite Tyler Labine, and as murder suspect Muhammed Qadir on the long-running CBS crime-drama Blue Bloods opposite stars Donnie Wahlberg and Marisa Ramirez. In 2022, Siddiqui voiced the recurring character JR, a bumbling squadroom cop on the first season of the Amazon Prime original Mexican comedy series Harina, based on a viral hit comedic sketch from popular video sketch comedy group Backdoor. He also guest-starred on the hit CBS series FBI, produced by Dick Wolf, as mercenary Tamir Hazara, an old arch-nemesis of series star Zeeko Zaki's Agent OA Zidan, who returns from apparent death in Afghanistan to wreak vengeance in New York City. Siddiqui has also recently completed work as a recurring character on the upcoming 2023 Paramount+ series Lioness, starring Zoe Saldana, Nicole Kidman and Laysla de Oliveira.

Siddiqui has also appeared in commercials for Home Depot, Capital One, Math Wizard, Danbury Hospital and others. He regularly performs with such South Florida improvisational troupes as Laughing Gas and Impromedy, with the Improv Playhouse in Libertyville, Illinois, and with the Steel City Improv Theater in Pittsburgh, Pennsylvania. He is currently a co-director and performer with The Front Yard Theater Collective which produces a monthly variety show at the historic Olympia Theater in Miami. 

Siddiqui is also a cartoonist, having created a new field of live illustration of improvised theater shows, which he does for improv theaters throughout the country.

Journalism
Siddiqui studied journalism in college and graduated from the University of Miami in 2003 with a degree in English and Communication. After graduation, he moved to Indianapolis and worked for Islamic Horizons Magazine in Plainfield as an assistant editor and then to Chicago for a time as reporting fellow with Northwestern University's Academy for Alternative Journalism and the Chicago Reader in 2004. He has also freelanced for The Miami Herald and The Fort Lauderdale Sun Sentinel, including helping to cover the local Muslim community reaction to the Sept. 11th, 2001 terrorist attacks. His efforts to improv local news coverage of the Muslim community at this time was covered by the Miami New Times. He was also a section editor for the nationally syndicated Muslim community newspaper The Muslim Observer, covering the South Florida area.

Acting & improvisation
Siddiqui would later return to Miami and discover improvisational theater through the Laughing Gas Theater Company. Eventually, he would go on to study improv at Chicago's famous ImprovOlympic and Second City Theaters. He has also studied at Orlando's SAK Comedy Lab, and at New York's PIT and Magnet Theaters.

Today, he splits his time between his native Miami, Florida, New York, Los Angeles and Pittsburgh, PA, working as an actor and in improv throughout the United States, including performances at the Gainesville Improv Festival and at the Del Close Marathon in New York. He is a regular team member with Laughing Gas Improv, Impromedy, Sick Puppies, The Front Yard Theater Collective, Wunderstudies: The Improvised Musical, The Cellar Dwellers, The Pittsburgh Improv Jam, the Steel City Improv Theater, and They Improv.

In 2009, Siddiqui also taught workshops on Improvisational Acting at the National Academy of Performing Arts (NAPA) in Karachi, Pakistan.

Cartooning
During his time studying and performing improvisation in Chicago in 2008, Siddiqui developed a new form of cartooning by creating live cartoon versions of long-form improv shows, primarily at ImprovOlympic Theater, but also at other area theaters including The Second City, the Annoyance and the Playground.  He has since produced hundreds of such illustrations, being hired by many prominent improv teams around the country in the field to catalogue their work at those and at other theaters including iOWest and The Groundlings Theater in Los Angeles, the Upright Citizens Brigade in New York, Theatre 99 in Charleston, South Carolina, the Steel City Improv Theater in Pittsburgh and elsewhere. He has illustrated shows for teams at The Chicago Sketchfest, The Chicago Improv Festival, the Del Close Marathon, and the Gainesville Improv Festival.

Music
Siddiqui also founded a satiric comedic acoustic eclectic folk fusion band in college called The Muslim Cowboys and performed with them at Islamic events throughout the country.

Notes

References
 https://www.imdb.com/title/tt1288500/
 https://web.archive.org/web/20100908234337/http://www.laughinggasimprov.com/current_cast.htm
 http://www.impromedymiami.com/ 
 https://web.archive.org/web/20090331224622/http://chicago.ioimprov.com/
 http://www.improvplayhouse.com/
 http://www.sakcomedy.com
 http://www.steelcityimprov.com
 A well-respected improv news & classified section used by the Chicago Improv Community and the leadership of various local theaters, featuring reviews of his work.
 Similar improv resource page for the New York improv community.
 Note, these are not regular message boards. These sections are strictly monitored informational portals for improv news in two of the biggest markets for such work in the country, created and run by the leaders of leading theaters in the field.
 A British website covering Muslim community news.
 http://www.miaminewtimes.com/content/printVersion/243489/ 
 http://nl.newsbank.com/nl-search/we/Archives?p_multi=MH%7C&p_product=MH&p_theme=realcities2&p_action=search&p_maxdocs=200&s_site=miamii&s_trackval=MH&s_dispstring=fawad%20siddiqui%20AND%20&p_field_advanced-0=&p_text_advanced-0=(fawad%20siddiqui)&xcal_numdocs=20&p_perpage=50&p_sort=YMD_date:D&p_field_date-0=YMD_date&p_params_date-0=date:B,E&p_text_date-0=before%2001/17/2011&xcal_useweights=no

External links

American male actors
Living people
University of Miami School of Communication alumni
American male journalists
American people of Pakistani descent
Year of birth missing (living people)